ATP-binding cassette sub-family G member 1 is a protein that in humans is encoded by the ABCG1 gene. It is a homolog of the well-known Drosophila gene white.

Function 

The protein encoded by this gene is a member of the superfamily of ATP-binding cassette (ABC) transporters. ABC proteins transport various molecules across extra- and intra-cellular membranes. ABC genes are divided into seven distinct subfamilies (ABC1, MDR/TAP, MRP, ALD, OABP, GCN20, White). This protein is a member of the White subfamily (subfamily G). It is involved in macrophage cholesterol and phospholipids transport, and may regulate cellular lipid homeostasis in other cell types. Several alternative splice variants have been identified.

See also 
 ATP-binding cassette transporter

References

Further reading

External links 
 
 

ATP-binding cassette transporters